Richard D. Muma is an American academic, physician assistant and president of Wichita State University. He was named Wichita State University president by the Kansas Board of Regents in May 2021 after serving in an interim role following the departure of Jay Golden in September 2020.

Muma is the first physician assistant to be named president of a university, and he is the first openly gay president of Wichita State.

References 

Presidents of Wichita State University

Year of birth missing (living people)
Living people